Thikrian is a village located on G.T Road Lalamusa and union council of Gujrat District, in the Punjab province of Pakistan. It is part of Kharian Tehsil and is located at 32°43'40N 73°56'0E with an altitude of 254 metres (836 feet).

References

Union councils of Gujrat District
Populated places in Gujrat District